127 may refer to:
127 (number), a natural number
AD 127, a year in the 2nd century AD
127 BC, a year in the 2nd century BC
127 (band), an Iranian band

See also
List of highways numbered 127

12/7 (disambiguation)